The United States government has detained or interned immigrants on military bases on several occasions, including as part of internment of Japanese Americans, of Italian Americans and of German Americans during World War II. In the 2010s, military bases have been used to house unaccompanied asylum seekers from Central America.

World War II internment 
These camps held detainees of Japanese, German and Italian descent:

 Fort McDowell/Angel Island, California
 Camp Blanding, Florida
 Camp Forrest, Tennessee
 Camp Livingston, Louisiana
 Camp Lordsburg, New Mexico
 Camp McCoy, Wisconsin
 Florence, Arizona
 Fort Bliss, New Mexico and Texas
 Fort Howard, Maryland
 Fort Lewis, Washington
 Fort Meade, Maryland
 Fort Richardson, Alaska
 Fort Sam Houston, Texas
 Fort Sill, Oklahoma
 Griffith Park, California
 Honouliuli Internment Camp, Hawaiʻi
 Sand Island, Hawaiʻi
 Stringtown, Oklahoma

Central American migrants under Obama 
As part of the 2014 American immigration crisis, tens of thousands of arriving migrants were detained by the United States. From May to August 2014, the Department of Defense operated temporary detention facilities housing as many as 7,700 unaccompanied children mostly from El Salvador, Guatemala and Honduras. The children were held at Joint Base San Antonio-Lackland in Texas, Fort Sill Army Base in Oklahoma and Naval Base Ventura County-Port Hueneme in California.

Central American migrants under Trump 
Amid the Trump administration family separation policy, the Department of Health and Human Services began discussing detaining arriving immigrant families and children on military facilities. Executive Order 13841, signed on June 20, 2018, instructs that, "The Secretary of Defense shall take all legally available measures to provide to the Secretary, upon request, any existing facilities available for the housing and care of alien families, and shall construct such facilities if necessary and consistent with law." On June 21, the Department of Health and Human Services requested facilities to house migrant children. Pentagon spokesmen and a memorandum sent to Congress confirmed that the Department of Defense was preparing facilities at four military bases in Texas and Arkansas to house 20,000 "unaccompanied alien children".

 Fort Bliss, near El Paso, Texas—On June 25, the Associated Press reported that Fort Bliss had been chosen to house migrant families.

See also
 List of detention sites in the United States

References 

Immigration detention centers and prisons in the United States